Denham Bay is a large bay which stretches along the entire west coast of Raoul Island in New Zealand's Kermadec Islands chain, from Hutchison Bluff in the north to Smith Bluff in the south. The bay gave its name to the Denham caldera, which was formed some 2,200 years ago by a massive volcanic eruption.

Landforms of the Kermadec Islands
Raoul Island
Bays of the New Zealand outlying islands